NPC is a digital girl group, virtual band and "AI girl group" formed in 2021 by Grimes. The digital group is currently all in progress and is beta. NPC became popular for their debut single with Chris Lake, "A Drug from God", gaining the group over 1 million monthly listeners on Spotify, at that time.

Discography

Singles 

 2021: "A Drug from God" (with Chris Lake)
 2022: "A Drug from God" (Sosa UK Remix)
 2022: "A Drug from God" (Rebūke Remix)

References 

Girl groups
Musical groups established in 2021